Kaslo was a provincial electoral district in the Canadian province of British Columbia. It made its first appearance in the election of 1903 and its last in the general election of 1920. It was succeeded by the Kaslo-Slocan riding in the 1924 election.

For other current and historical electoral districts in the Kootenay region, please see Kootenay (electoral districts).

Electoral history
Note: Winners in each election are in bold.

|-

|Liberal
|John Ley Retallack
|align="right"|231 	
|align="right"|34.84%

|- bgcolor="white"
!align="right" colspan=3|Total valid votes
!align="right"|663
!align="right"|100.00%
 	 	 	 	

|-

|Liberal
|John Keen
|align="right"|189 	
|align="right"|44.79%
|align="right"|
|align="right"|unknown

|- bgcolor="white"
!align="right" colspan=3|Total valid votes
!align="right"|422
!align="right"|100.00%
!align="right"|
|- bgcolor="white"
!align="right" colspan=3|Total rejected ballots
!align="right"|
!align="right"|
!align="right"|
|- bgcolor="white"
!align="right" colspan=3|Turnout
!align="right"|%
!align="right"|
!align="right"|
|} 	 	 	

|-

|Liberal
|John Keen
|align="right"|134 	
|align="right"|31.38%
|align="right"|
|align="right"|unknown

|- bgcolor="white"
!align="right" colspan=3|Total valid votes
!align="right"|427
!align="right"|100.00%
!align="right"|
|- bgcolor="white"
!align="right" colspan=3|Total rejected ballots
!align="right"|
!align="right"|
!align="right"|
|- bgcolor="white"
!align="right" colspan=3|Turnout
!align="right"|%
!align="right"|
!align="right"|
|}

|-

|- bgcolor="white"
!align="right" colspan=3|Total valid votes
!align="right"|n/a
!align="right"|-.-%
!align="right"|
|- bgcolor="white"
!align="right" colspan=3|Total rejected ballots
!align="right"|
!align="right"|
!align="right"|
|- bgcolor="white"
!align="right" colspan=3|Turnout
!align="right"|%
!align="right"|
!align="right"|
|}

|-

|Liberal
|John Keen
|align="right"|456
|align="right"|54.94%
|align="right"|
|align="right"|unknown

|- bgcolor="white"
!align="right" colspan=3|Total valid votes
!align="right"|830
!align="right"|100.00%
!align="right"|
|- bgcolor="white"
!align="right" colspan=3|Total rejected ballots
!align="right"|
!align="right"|
!align="right"|
|- bgcolor="white"
!align="right" colspan=3|Turnout
!align="right"|%
!align="right"|
!align="right"|
|}

|-

|Liberal
|John Keen
|align="right"|744 	
|align="right"|49.47%
|align="right"|
|align="right"|unknown

|- bgcolor="white"
!align="right" colspan=3|Total valid votes
!align="right"|1,504
!align="right"|100.00%
!align="right"|
|- bgcolor="white"
!align="right" colspan=3|Total rejected ballots
!align="right"|
!align="right"|
!align="right"|
|- bgcolor="white"
!align="right" colspan=3|
!align="right"|%
!align="right"|
!align="right"|
|- bgcolor="white"
!align="right" colspan=7|1 Also referred to as "Conservative-United Farmer" candidate.
|}

The 1920 election was the last appearance of the Kaslo riding. For the 1924 election it was merged with Slocan to form Kaslo-Slocan.

Sources
Elections BC historical returns

Former provincial electoral districts of British Columbia